Szűcsi is a village in Heves County, Hungary. As of 2015, it has a population of 1,569, and 1,462 as of the 2021 estimate. Until 2019, it was part of Gyöngyös District.

History
The earliest written record of the village dates back to 1267.

Demographics
According the 2011 census, 93.3% of the population were of Hungarian ethnicity, 2.7% were Gypsies, 6.7% were undeclared, and 0.6% were German (due to dual identities, the total may be higher than 100%). The religious distribution was as follows: Roman Catholic 73.8%, Reformed 1.7%, Lutheran 0.4%, non-denominational 5.5%, and 18.2% unknown.

References

Populated places in Heves County